XHCAM-FM is a radio station in Campeche, Campeche. It currently airs a pop music format as Kiss 101.9 FM.

History
The concession for XECAM-AM 1280 was issued on December 13, 1962, . It became an FM combo in 1994 with XHCAM-FM on 98.9. It moved to 101.9 MHz in 2005 in order to increase its power from 1,640 watts while not affecting XHCMN-FM in Ciudad del Carmen.

The AM station was surrendered on November 24, 2017.

References

Radio stations in Campeche
Mass media in Campeche City